Roshon van Eijma (born 6 June 1998) is a professional footballer who plays as a centre back for Eerste Divisie club TOP Oss. Born in the Netherlands, he represents the Curaçao national team.

Club career

Roda JC Kerkrade
He made his Eerste Divisie debut for Roda JC Kerkrade on 28 September 2018 in a game against SC Cambuur.

Preußen Münster
In September 2020, he moved from Kerkrade to Preußen Münster. He played his first game on 13 December against Rot-Weiß Oberhausen, in which he was sent off with a red card in the 54th minute. In his first season in Germany, Van Eijma played eleven games in the Regionalliga West and won the Westphalian Cup with the club.

On 17 August 2021, his contract was terminated by mutual agreement. Upon his release, sporting director for Preußen Münster, Peter Niemeyer stated: "As nice as it is to have a national player in your own ranks, so great are the difficulties associated with it. For a Regionalliga team that does not plan for international breaks in its schedule, the many national team selections were unfortunately no longer feasible in the end. This was not a satisfactory situation for neither player nor club. We thank Roshon for his commitment and wish him all the best for the future."

TOP Oss
Ten days after being released by Preußen Münster, Van Eijma signed with Eerste Divisie club TOP Oss. On 9 October, he made his debut as a second-half substitute for Nicolas Abdat in the 2–1 loss to FC Eindhoven away at Jan Louwers Stadion.

International career
Van Eijma debuted for the Curaçao national team in a 5–0 2022 FIFA World Cup qualification win over Saint Vincent and the Grenadines on 25 March 2021.

References

External links
 

1998 births
Footballers from Tilburg
Living people
Curaçao footballers
Curaçao international footballers
Dutch footballers
Dutch people of Curaçao descent
Roda JC Kerkrade players
SC Preußen Münster players
TOP Oss players
Eerste Divisie players
Regionalliga players
Association football defenders
Dutch expatriate footballers
Expatriate footballers in Germany
Curaçao expatriate footballers
Curaçao expatriate sportspeople in Germany